Luran Ahmeti (31 July 1974 – 25 March 2021) was an Albanian actor of theater, cinema and television.

Early years and his career 
Luran Ahmeti was born on 31 July 1974, in Skopje, Socialist Federal Republic of Yugoslavia, to a family of Albanian descent. He stated that his father was a literary and anti-communist, and that he had been discriminated against as a child. He graduated with a bachelor's degree in psychology from St. Cyril and Methodius University of Skopje. After graduation, he studied drama. He started his acting career by first appearing in several productions in Skopje. Ahmeti, who can speak Turkish well because his childhood was spent in Turkish towns in Macedonia, first started acting in Turkey by portraying the character of Dimitri in the TV series Elveda Rumeli. He played Ottoman statesman Divane Hüsrev Pasha in the 2013 TV series Muhteşem Yüzyıl.

Personal life and opinions 
Ahmeti, who started living in Istanbul, where came to shoot the series Elveda Rumeli, got married with an Albanian girl. In an interview in 2016, Ahmeti described the wars as "the worst thing in the world" and stated that he was still afraid of the Russians because of his life of exile in the past and living with the Slavs in his childhood, he did not trust them and would not be friends with the Russians all his life.

Dead 
He died on March 25, 2021, in Skopje, the capital of North Macedonia, due to COVID-19 at the age of 46.

Filmography

Cinema 

 Puppet Show (1998)
 Stories about Love (2001)
 Bal-Can-Can (2004)
 10 (2007)
 Izstop (2007)
 Hayde Bre (2010)
 Güzel Günler Göreceğiz (2011)
 Limonata (2015)
 Acı Kiraz (2020)

TV series 

 Kurtlar Vadisi Pusu (2015-2016)
 Mutlu Ol Yeter (2015)
 Muhteşem Yüzyıl (2013)
 Son Yaz-Balkanlar 1912 (2012)
 Elveda Rumeli (2007-2009)
 Balkan Düğünü (2009)
 Bahar Dalları (2009)
 Tek Başımıza (2011)
 Reis (2011)
 Karakol - Herkes Adalet İster (2011)
 Büyük Sürgün Kafkasya (2015-2016)

References 

1974 births
2021 deaths
20th-century Macedonian male actors
21st-century Macedonian male actors
Albanians in North Macedonia
Male actors from Skopje
Deaths from the COVID-19 pandemic in North Macedonia